Bonneville may refer to:

People

 Benjamin Louis Eulalie de Bonneville (1796–1878), French-born officer in the United States Army, fur trapper, and explorer in the American West
 Gerard Bonneville, fictional character in Book of Dust
 Hugh Bonneville (born 1963, English actor
 Nicholas Bonneville (born 1760), French writer

Places in Belgium
 Bonneville, Namur, former municipality in the province Namur, now part of Andenne

Places in France

 Bonneville, Charente, in the Charente département
 Bonneville, Haute-Savoie, in the Haute Savoie département
 La Bonneville, in the Manche département
 Bonneville, Somme, in the Somme département
 Bonneville-Aptot, in the Eure département
 Bonneville-et-Saint-Avit-de-Fumadières, in the Dordogne département
 La Bonneville-sur-Iton, in the Eure département
 Bonneville-la-Louvet, in the Calvados département
 Bonneville-sur-Touques, in the Calvados département

Places in the United States

 Bonneville, California, former name of Boonville, California
 Lake Bonneville, a prehistoric pluvial lake that covered much of North America's Great Basin region
 Bonneville Salt Flats, an ancient lake bed of Lake Bonneville in Utah often used by early auto racers and the site of most of the world land speed record runs
 Bonneville Dam, on the Columbia River between Washington and Oregon states
 Bonneville Reservoir, known also as Lake Bonneville, the reservoir impounded by the Bonneville Dam
 Bonneville, Oregon, the site of Bonneville Dam
 North Bonneville, Washington, across the Columbia River from Bonneville, Oregon
 Bonneville County, in Southeastern Idaho

Vehicles

 Triumph Bonneville, a motorcycle named after the Salt Flats
 Pontiac Bonneville, the name of an up-scale, full-size Pontiac known for performance, produced from 1958 to 2005 
 Pontiac Bonneville Special, a concept or experimental car that debuted at the General Motors Motorama in 1956

Other uses

 Bonneville (film), a 2006 drama film
 Bonneville (crater), a Martian crater visited by the Mars Exploration Rover in 2004
 Bonneville International, a media and broadcasting company
 Bonneville High School (disambiguation)

See also
 Bonnyville, Alberta in Canada
 Bonnieville, Kentucky
 Bonneville Power Administration